The Boxing World Cup was an international boxing event organized by the International Boxing Association (AIBA), featuring boxers competing in different weight divisions. It was held from 1979 to 1998 as an individual competition and from 2002 to 2006 as a team competition. In 2008 the format returned to individual competition, though the team score was still accounted for.

History 
Individual boxers were competing in their weight categories as part of the team competition, with the overall winner decided by the higher number of total wins. Each team represented countries and continents. The number of weight categories differed per Cup. Related type of competition could be considered boxing team duels, often held between countries as part of the final stage of preparation for the World Amateur Boxing Championships.

The event took place twelve times, from 1979 to 2008. In 2005, the event took place in Moscow, Russia, and the Russian team won. In the next event was held in Baku, Azerbaijan, and the Cuban team won.

After a new president was elected in the International Boxing Association and the event stopped. It didn't take place in 2007. In 2008, it was announced by the boxing organization that the event would continue on, but in a different competition, which will happen once in two years and the following one being in 2008. It will feature the top ranked boxers competing in this event in their weight categories. The place chosen for the event was Moscow.

Competition format 
Certain editions of the World Cup, held in the 1990s, saw individual matches of five two-minute rounds.

Results by year

Statistics by country 

Notes
 In 2005, there was a group stage followed by knock-out system and there were a semi-finals.
 In 2006, the third place was shared between the two teams that finished second in their groups.
 In 2008, the results were based on the medal table after the individual competitions.

United States Olympic Cup

See also
 World Amateur Boxing Championships

References

External links
AIBA Moscow official website

 
World Cup
World cups
World Cup
Recurring sporting events established in 2005
Recurring sporting events disestablished in 2008